Vundwe Island is a small uninhabited island in Tanzania. The islet is part of the Zanzibar Archipelago, and is located near the southwestern coast of Unguja. It lies only 300 m south of Uzi Island and it has an area of 1,4 km2. Its elevation is about 17 m above sea level. The waters surrounding the island are used as a site for commercial fishing.

Vundwe is relatively isolated and it is not a protected area, unlike the nearby Kiwengwa/Pongwe Forest Reserve.  The island has a high coral rag forest with tall trees like Adansonia digitata baobabs, which has, in recent years, started to be subjected to extensive clearing.  This impacts the habitat of the Zanzibar red colobus, an endangered species of red colobus monkey which the island houses. The species population also declines because of poisonings.

References

Islands of Zanzibar
Uninhabited islands of Tanzania